Peter Ricchiuti (Ri-Choo-ty) is a business professor at Tulane University's Freeman School of Business.

Ricchiuti, a graduate of Babson College, started his career at the investment firm of Kidder Peabody & Co. and later served as the chief investment officer for the State of Louisiana. There he successfully managed a $3 billion portfolio.

He founded and runs  Tulane University's Burkenroad Reports student stock research program. Here he leads 200 of the school's business students in search of overlooked and under-followed stocks in six southern states. He and his program have been featured widely in the financial press including The Wall Street Journal, BARRON'S and The New York Times.

Ricchiuti served as a director of Amedisys Inc., the world's largest publicly traded home health care and hospice company, from 1997 to 2015.

In 2014, The Financial Times published Ricchiuti's first book, Stocks Under Rocks. He currently hosts a weekly business program called Out to Lunch on National Public Radio in New Orleans.

Ricchiuti has addressed over 1000 groups in 47 states. These groups include nuns, tin can manufactures, money managers, waterpark owners, insurance professionals, NFL players and he has even done a couple of TED Talks.

Awards
Ricchiuti has twice been voted the Top Professor of the Year by students at the Freeman School of Business.

Burkenroad Reports

Ricchiuti founded the Burkenroad Reports in 1993.  The Burkenroad Reports is an innovative student-run investment research program at Tulane University.  The reports focus on stocks of small-cap companies in six southern states, ranging from Texas to Florida.  The Burkenroad program has been featured in The Wall Street Journal, The New York Times,  CNBC, CNN, and Nightly Business Report.

References

External links
Faculty profile at the Freeman School of Business.
CNN Interviews Peter Ricchiuti, CNN, April 2006.
Peter Ricchiuti's Website
Burkenroad Reports
6-minute YouTube piece for the American Program Bureau, posted June 4, 2008.
Ricchiuti’s Business Educators Member Profile

Freeman School of Business faculty
Tulane University faculty
Living people
1957 births